The 1990 Lower Saxony state election was held on 13 May 1990 to elect the members of the 12th Landtag of Lower Saxony. The incumbent coalition government of the Christian Democratic Union (CDU) and Free Democratic Party (FDP) led by Minister-President Ernst Albrecht was defeated. The Social Democratic Party (SPD) subsequently formed a coalition with The Greens, and SPD leader Gerhard Schröder was elected Minister-President.

Parties
The table below lists parties represented in the 11th Landtag of Lower Saxony.

Election result

|-
! colspan="2" | Party
! Votes
! %
! +/-
! Seats 
! +/-
! Seats %
|-
| bgcolor=| 
| align=left | Social Democratic Party (SPD)
| align=right| 1,865,267
| align=right| 44.2
| align=right| 2.1
| align=right| 71
| align=right| 5
| align=right| 45.8
|-
| bgcolor=| 
| align=left | Christian Democratic Union (CDU)
| align=right| 1,771,974
| align=right| 42.0
| align=right| 2.3
| align=right| 67
| align=right| 2
| align=right| 43.2
|-
| bgcolor=| 
| align=left | Free Democratic Party (FDP)
| align=right| 252,615
| align=right| 6.0
| align=right| 0.0
| align=right| 9
| align=right| ±0
| align=right| 5.8
|-
| bgcolor=| 
| align=left | Alliance 90/The Greens (Grüne)
| align=right| 229,846
| align=right| 5.5
| align=right| 1.6
| align=right| 8
| align=right| 3
| align=right| 5.2
|-
! colspan=8|
|-
| bgcolor=|
| align=left | The Republicans (REP)
| align=right| 62,054
| align=right| 1.5
| align=right| 1.5
| align=right| 0
| align=right| ±0
| align=right| 0
|-
| bgcolor=|
| align=left | Others
| align=right| 34,540
| align=right| 0.8
| align=right| 
| align=right| 0
| align=right| ±0
| align=right| 0
|-
! align=right colspan=2| Total
! align=right| 4,216,296
! align=right| 100.0
! align=right| 
! align=right| 155
! align=right| ±0
! align=right| 
|-
! align=right colspan=2| Voter turnout
! align=right| 
! align=right| 74.6
! align=right| 2.7
! align=right| 
! align=right| 
! align=right| 
|}

Sources
 Landtagswahlen in Niedersachsen

1990
Lower Saxony
May 1990 events in Europe